Cape Verde–France relations are the bilateral relations between France and Cape Verde.

History

Shortly after Cape Verde became independent from the Portuguese Empire in 1975, France recognized its sovereignty. Diplomatic contacts were held through the French representative at Dakar, Senegal.  A resident ambassador was appointed from France in 1982 and its embassy in Praia opened.

With the signature of the cultural, scientific and technical cooperation accord between the French and Cape Verdean governments, the first mission with French cooperation was done in 1976 in Cape Verde.  Its first action was the opening of the Fajã Gallery in Ribeira Brava on the island of São Nicolau.

Between 1977 and 1995, it made 10 to 15 cooperations, a bilateral cooperative mission on the number of sectors in Cape Verde including agriculture, health, tourism, finances, education, governance, safety, etc.

In 1996, Cape Verde opened its embassy in Paris at Rue de Rigny.

In 2010, it opened the Institut français du Cap-Vert (IFCV), the French Institute of Cape Verde, opened after the merger of the French Cultural Center (Centre culturel français (CCF)) and SCAC (Service de Coopération et d’Action Culturelle).

On August 31, 2014, the French Institute in Cape Verde was closed.

Diaspora

In 2014, there were 405 French citizens, half of whom (201) are Cape Verdeans or with other nationality.  In 2001, there were 186 French citizens, there were over 200 in 2004 and over 300 in 2007.

Resident diplomatic missions
 Cape Verde has an embassy in Paris and a consulate-general in Nice.
 France has an embassy in Praia.

Cape Verde has three French consulates, one in Mindelo located on a historic building, the other in Santa Maria in the island of Sal and Rabil on the island of Boa Vista.

See also 
 Foreign relations of Cape Verde
 Foreign relations of France

References

External links
French embassy in Cape Verde
French Ministry of Foreign Affairs - Cape Verde
Capeverdean embassy in Paris 

 
Bilateral relations of Cape Verde
Cape Verde